The 192nd New York State Legislature, consisting of the New York State Senate and the New York State Assembly, met from January 8, 1997, to December 31, 1998, during the third and fourth years of George Pataki's governorship, in Albany.

Background
Under the provisions of the New York Constitution of 1938 and the U.S. Supreme Court decision to follow the One man, one vote rule, re-apportioned in 1992 by the Legislature, 61 Senators and 150 assemblymen were elected in single-seat districts for two-year terms. Senate and Assembly districts consisted of approximately the same number of inhabitants, the area being apportioned contiguously without restrictions regarding county boundaries.

At this time there were two major political parties: the Democratic Party and the Republican Party. The Reform Party, the Conservative Party, the Liberal Party, the Green Party, the Right to Life Party, the Libertarian Party, the Tax Cut Now Party, the Natural Law Party, the Workers World Party and the Socialist Workers Party also nominated tickets.

Elections
The New York state election, 1996, was held on November 5. No statewide elective offices were up for election. The approximate party strength at this election, as expressed by the vote for U.S. president, was: Democrats 3,650,000; Republicans 1,739,000; Reform 503,000; Conservatives 183,000; Liberals 107,000; Green 76,000; Right to Life 24,000; Libertarians 12,000; Tax Cut Now 11,000; Natural Law 5,000; Workers World 3,500; and Socialist Workers 3,000.

All 38 sitting women members of the legislature—State Senators Catherine M. Abate (Dem.), of Manhattan; Nancy Larraine Hoffmann (Dem.), of Syracuse; Olga A. Méndez (Dem.), of East Harlem; Velmanette Montgomery (Dem.), of Brooklyn; Suzi Oppenheimer (Dem.), of Mamaroneck; Mary Lou Rath (Rep.), of Williamsville; Nellie R. Santiago (Dem.), of Brooklyn; and Ada L. Smith (Dem.), of Queens; and Assemblywomen Patricia Acampora (Rep.), of Mattituck; Carmen E. Arroyo (Dem.), of the Bronx; Nancy Calhoun (Rep.), of Blooming Grove; Joan Christensen (Dem.), of Syracuse; Barbara M. Clark (Dem.), of Queens; Elizabeth Connelly (Dem.), of Staten Island; Vivian E. Cook (Dem.) of Queens; RoAnn Destito (Dem.), of Rome; Gloria Davis (Dem.), of the Bronx; Eileen C. Dugan (Dem.), of Brooklyn; Donna Ferrara (Rep.), a lawyer of Westbury; Sandy Galef (Dem.), of Ossining; Deborah J. Glick (Dem.), of Manhattan; Aurelia Greene (Dem.), of the Bronx; Audrey Hochberg (Dem.), of Scarsdale; Earlene Hill Hooper (Dem.), of Hempstead; Rhoda S. Jacobs (Dem.), of Brooklyn; Susan V. John (Dem.), of Rochester; Melinda Katz (Dem.), a lawyer of Queens; Betty Little (Rep.), of Queensbury; Naomi C. Matusow (Dem.), a lawyer of Armonk; Nettie Mayersohn (Dem.), of Queens; Debra J. Mazzarelli (Rep.), of Patchogue; Patricia McGee (Rep.), of Franklinville; Catherine Nolan (Dem.), of Queens; Chloe Ann O'Neil (Rep.), an elementary school teacher of Parishville; Audrey Pheffer (Dem.), of Queens; Frances T. Sullivan (Rep.), of Fulton; Helene Weinstein (Dem.), a lawyer of Brooklyn; and Sandra Lee Wirth (Rep.), of West Seneca—were re-elected. Ann-Margaret Carrozza (Dem.), a lawyer of Queens, was also elected to the Assembly.

Eileen C. Dugan died three days after the election. On February 18, 1997, Joan Millman (Dem.), a teacher and librarian of Brooklyn, was elected to fill the vacancy.

The New York state election, 1997, was held on November 4. One vacancy in the State Senate was filled.

On February 3, 1998, Adele Cohen (Dem.), a lawyer of Brooklyn; Kate Murray (Rep.), a lawyer of Levittown; and Maureen O'Connell (Rep.), a registered nurse and lawyer of East Williston; were elected to fill vacancies in the Assembly.

On March 24, 1998, Pauline Rhodd-Cummings (Dem.), of Queens, was elected to fill a vacancy in the Assembly. Thus the 192nd Legislature ended having 43 women members, surpassing the previous record of 39 in the 190th New York State Legislature (1994).

Sessions
The Legislature met for the first regular session (the 220th) at the State Capitol in Albany on January 8, 1997; and recessed indefinitely on August 4.

Sheldon Silver (Dem.) was re-elected Speaker of the Assembly.

Joseph Bruno (Rep.) was re-elected Temporary President of the Senate.

The Legislature met for the second regular session (the 221st) at the State Capitol in Albany on January 7, 1998; and recessed indefinitely on June 19.

The Assembly met again on July 29, 1998, to enact a bill on parole which had been approved by the Senate during the regular session.

The Legislature met again from December 17 to 18, 1998, to enact another piece of legislation concerning the school system of New York City, and to raise the salaries of the members of the next Legislature.

State Senate

Senators
The asterisk (*) denotes members of the previous Legislature who continued in office as members of this Legislature. Assemblyman Michael Balboni was elected to fill a vacancy in the Senate.

Note: For brevity, the chairmanships omit the words "...the Committee on (the)..."

Employees
 Secretary: Stephen F. Sloan (1997)
Steven M. Boggess (1998)

State Assembly

Assembly members
The asterisk (*) denotes members of the previous Legislature who continued in office as members of this Legislature.

Note: For brevity, the chairmanships omit the words "...the Committee on (the)..."

Employees
 Clerk: Francine Misasi

Notes

Sources
 Results of Voting in New York Races for the State Legislature and the Courts in The New York Times on November 7, 1996

192
1997 politics in New York (state)
1998 politics in New York (state)
1997 U.S. legislative sessions
1998 U.S. legislative sessions